Xenon hexafluoride is a noble gas compound with the formula XeF6.  It is one of the three binary fluorides of xenon, the other two being XeF2 and XeF4.  All known are exergonic and stable at normal temperatures.  XeF6 is the strongest fluorinating agent of the series. It is a colorless solid that readily sublimes into intensely yellow vapors.

Preparation
Xenon hexafluoride can be prepared by heating of XeF2 at about 300 °C under 6 MPa (60 atmospheres) of fluorine.  With  as catalyst, however, this reaction can proceed at 120 °C even in xenon-fluorine molar ratios as low as 1:5.

Structure
In the gas phase the compound is monomeric. VSEPR theory predicts that due to the presence of six fluoride ligands and one lone pair of electrons the structure lacks perfect octahedral symmetry, and indeed electron diffraction combined with high-level calculations indicate that the compound's point group is C3v. It is a fluxional molecule. Oh is only insignificantly higher, indicating that the minimum on the energy surface is very shallow.

129Xe and 19F NMR spectroscopy indicates  that in solution the compound assumes a tetrameric structure: four equivalent xenon atoms are arranged in a tetrahedron surrounded by a fluctuating array of 24 fluorine atoms that interchange positions in a "cogwheel mechanism".

Reactions

Hydrolysis

Xenon hexafluoride hydrolyzes, ultimately affording xenon trioxide:

XeF6 + H2O  →  XeOF4  +  2 HF
XeOF4 + H2O  →  XeO2F2  +  2 HF
XeO2F2  +  H2O  →  XeO3  +  2 HF
XeF6 + 3 H2O  → XeO3 + 6 HF

XeF6 is a Lewis acid, binding one and two fluoride anions:

XeF6 + F− →  XeF
XeF + F− → XeF

Octafluoroxenates

Salts of the octafluoroxenate(VI) anion (XeF) are very stable, decomposing only above 400 °C. This anion has been shown to have square antiprismatic geometry, based on single-crystal X-ray counter analysis of its nitrosonium salt, . The sodium and potassium salts are formed directly from sodium fluoride and potassium fluoride:

2 NaF +  → 
2 KF +  → 

These are thermally less stable than the caesium and rubidium salts, which are synthesized by first forming the heptafluoroxenate salts:

CsF +   →  
RbF +   →  

which are then pyrolysed at 50 °C and 20 °C, respectively, to form the yellow octafluoroxenate salts:

2  →  + 
2  →  + 

These salts are hydrolysed by water, yielding various products containing xenon and oxygen.

The two other binary fluorides of xenon do not form such stable adducts with fluoride.

With fluoride acceptors

 +  → XeFRuF

 +  → XeFAuF +

References

External links
 WebBook page for XeF6

Xenon(VI) compounds
Hexafluorides
Nonmetal halides
Fluorinating agents
Gases with color